Events in the year 1749 in Portugal.

Incumbents
Monarch: John V

Events

Births

29 September – Catarina de Lencastre, Viscountess of Balsemão, noblewoman, poet and playwright (d. 1824).

Deaths

29 May – Jaime Álvares Pereira de Melo, 3rd Duke of Cadaval, nobleman and statesman (b. 1684).

References

 
1740s in Portugal
Years of the 18th century in Portugal
Portugal